Thomas Lee Schanley (born May 5, 1961) is an American actor who has appeared in a number of television series and feature films.

His television credits include roles in S.W.A.T,  NCIS: New Orleans, NCIS: LA, Graceland, Hawaii Five-O, Castle, Dexter, The Forgotten, Criminal Minds, CSI: Miami, CSI: NY, Dynasty, Baywatch, Melrose Place, ER, The Yellow Rose, Fame, T. J. Hooker, JAG, Murder, She Wrote, and Star Trek: Enterprise.

His feature film credits include (most recent first) Get the Gringo, A Better Life. alongside Oscar Nominee Demián Bichir, Conspiracy Theory, Courage Under Fire, Fever Pitch and Nothing Underneath.

References

External links

Tom Schanley's Official Website
Tom Schanley's Biography
Tom Schanley Birthday on May 5 

1961 births
Living people
American male film actors
American male television actors